Miret is a surname. Notable people with the surname include:

María Miret (born 1995), Spanish footballer
Roger Miret (born 1964), Cuban-born American singer

See also
Mirette (opera), an opéra comique composed by André Messager
Viret